Jay Prakash Malla was the twenty-sixth king of the Mallabhum. He ruled from 1097 to 1102 CE.

History
Prakash Malla established a village at the north east corner of the Dwakeshwar river and also established Prakash ghat business center.

References

Sources
 

Malla rulers
Kings of Mallabhum
11th-century Indian monarchs
Mallabhum